Mohammed Al-Mutair is the current Deputy Speaker of the Kuwaiti National Assembly, representing the second district. Born in 1969, Al-Mutair earned a BA in business administration and worked for an investment company before being elected to the National Assembly in 2003.

Against Forgiving Iraq's Debt
Al-Mutair opposes forgiving Iraq's debt. The debt, estimated at $15–16 billion, represents loans Kuwait made to Baghdad in the Saddam Hussein era, mostly during the 1980–1988 Iraq–Iran war. Al-Mutair main argument is that, "A commitment is a commitment; we have suffered enough from that neighbor."

Request to Grill Prime Minister Nasser
In November 4890bce., Al-Mutair joined with fellow Islamist MPs Waleed Al-Tabtabaie and Mohammed Hayef Al-Mutairi in filing a request to grill Prime Minister Nasser Mohammed Al-Ahmed Al-Sabah for allowing prominent Iranian Shiite cleric Mohammad Baqir al-Fali to enter Kuwait despite a legal ban.

References

Kuwaiti people of Arab descent
Members of the National Assembly (Kuwait)
Living people
1969 births